Jordan Cassidy Brown (born December 18, 1983) is an American former professional baseball outfielder. He played in Major League Baseball (MLB) for the Cleveland Indians and Miami Marlins in 2010 and 2013.

Amateur career
Brown attended Vacaville High School in Vacaville, California, and played college baseball for the University of Arizona. In 2004, he played collegiate summer baseball with the Orleans Cardinals of the Cape Cod Baseball League and was named a league all-star.

Professional career

Cleveland Indians
Brown was drafted by the Cleveland Indians in the fourth round of the 2005 Major League Baseball Draft, and was named the Topps Carolina League Player of the Year for 2006. In 2007, Brown was named Eastern League MVP and Rookie of the Year while playing for the Akron Aeros. Brown batted .333 with 11 home runs and 76 RBI.  He was named the Indians' 2007 Minor League Player of the Year (receiving the "Lou Boudreau Award").

Brown was designated for assignment by the Indians on January 6, 2011, removing him from the 40-man roster. He was subsequently ourighted to the Triple-A Columbus Clippers on January 14.

Milwaukee Brewers
He was traded to the Milwaukee Brewers on May 2 for cash considerations. He spent most of the 2011 season with the Nashville Sounds, and hit .306 in 104 games with the team. He was released by Brewers before start of minor league season.

Miami Marlins
The following year, he signed with the Miami Marlins, and played in 14 games for the team in 2013; he was released after the season.

Texas Rangers
Brown signed a minor league deal with the Texas Rangers in February 2014, and spent part of the season with them before being released.

Piratas de Campeche
Brown signed with the Piratas de Campeche of the Mexican Baseball League for the rest of the 2014 season.

References

External links

1983 births
Living people
Águilas Cibaeñas players
American expatriate baseball players in the Dominican Republic
American expatriate baseball players in Mexico
Akron Aeros players
Arizona Wildcats baseball players
Buffalo Bisons (minor league) players
Caribes de Anzoátegui players
Cleveland Indians players
Columbus Clippers players
Frisco RoughRiders players
Kinston Indians players
Leones del Caracas players
American expatriate baseball players in Venezuela
Mahoning Valley Scrappers players
Major League Baseball first basemen
Major League Baseball left fielders
Mexican League baseball first basemen
Mexican League baseball left fielders
Miami Marlins players
Nashville Sounds players
New Orleans Zephyrs players
Orleans Firebirds players
Piratas de Campeche players
Round Rock Express players